Robinson Crusoe Island, formerly known as Más a Tierra, is the second largest of the Juan Fernández Islands, situated 670 km (362 nmi; 416 mi) west of San Antonio, Chile, in the South Pacific Ocean. It is the more populous of the inhabited islands in the archipelago (the other being Alejandro Selkirk Island), with most of that in the town of San Juan Bautista at Cumberland Bay on the island's north coast.

From 1704 to 1709, the island was home to the marooned sailor Alexander Selkirk, who at least partially inspired novelist Daniel Defoe's fictional Robinson Crusoe in his 1719 novel, although the novel is explicitly set in the Caribbean. This was just one of several survival stories from the period of which Defoe would have been aware. To reflect the literary lore associated with the island and attract tourists, the Chilean government renamed the place Robinson Crusoe Island in 1966.

Geography

Robinson Crusoe Island has a mountainous and undulating terrain, formed by ancient lava flows which have built up from numerous volcanic episodes. Intense erosion has resulted in the formation of steep valleys and ridges. A narrow peninsula is formed in the southwestern part of the island called Cordón Escarpado. The island of Santa Clara is located just off the southwest coast.

Robinson Crusoe Island lies to the west of the boundary between the Nazca Plate and the South American Plate, and rose from the ocean 3.8 – 4.2 million years ago. A volcanic eruption on the island was reported in 1743 from El Yunque, but this event is uncertain. The event was quite minor—only a Volcanic Explosivity Index 1 eruption—but it produced explosions and flames that lit up the island, along with tsunamis.

Climate
Robinson Crusoe has a subtropical climate, moderated by the cold Humboldt Current, which flows to the east of the island, and the southeast trade winds. Higher elevations are generally cooler, with occasional frosts. Rainfall is greater in the winter months, and varies with elevation and exposure; elevations above  experience almost daily rainfall, while the western, leeward side of the island is lower and drier.

Flora and fauna
The Fernandezian Region is a floristic region which includes the Juan Fernández Islands archipelago. It is in the Antarctic Floristic Kingdom, but often also included within the Neotropical Kingdom. As World Biosphere Reserves since 1977, these islands have been considered of maximum scientific importance because of the endemic plant families, genera, and species of flora and fauna. Out of 211 native plant species, 132 (63%) are endemic, as well as more than 230 species of insects.

Robinson Crusoe Island has one endemic plant family, Lactoridaceae. The Magellanic penguin is also found there. The Juan Fernández firecrown is an endemic and critically endangered red hummingbird, which is best known for its needle-fine black beak and silken feather coverage. The Masatierra petrel is named after the island's former name. The island (along with neighbouring Santa Clara) has been recognised as an Important Bird Area (IBA) by BirdLife International because it supports populations of Masatierra petrels, pink-footed shearwaters, Juan Fernandez firecrowns and Juan Fernandez tit-tyrants.

History
The island was first named Juan Fernandez Island after Juan Fernández, a Spanish sea captain and explorer who was the first to land there in 1574. It was also known as Más a Tierra. There is no evidence of an earlier discovery either by Polynesians, despite the proximity to Easter Island, or by Native Americans.

From 1681 to 1684, a Miskito man known as Will was marooned on the island. Twenty years later, in 1704, the sailor Alexander Selkirk was also marooned there, living in solitude for four years and four months. Selkirk had been gravely concerned about the seaworthiness of his ship, Cinque Ports (which ended up sinking very shortly after), and declared his wish to be left on the island during a mid-voyage restocking stop. His captain, Thomas Stradling, a colleague on the voyage of privateer and explorer William Dampier, was tired of his dissent and obliged. All Selkirk had left with him was a musket, gunpowder, carpenter's tools, a knife, a Bible, and some clothing. The story of Selkirk's rescue is included in the 1712 book A Voyage to the South Sea, and Round the World by Edward Cooke.

In an 1840 narrative, Two Years Before the Mast, Richard Henry Dana Jr. described the port of Juan Fernandez as a young prison colony. The penal institution was soon abandoned and the island again uninhabited before a permanent colony was eventually established in the latter part of the 19th century. Joshua Slocum visited the island between 26 April and 5 May 1896, during his solo global circumnavigation on the sloop Spray. The island and its 45 inhabitants are referred to in detail in Slocum's memoir, Sailing Alone Around the World.

World War I

During World War I, Vice Admiral Maximilian von Spee's German East Asia Squadron stopped and re-coaled at the island 26–28 October 1914, four days before the Battle of Coronel. While at the island, the admiral was unexpectedly rejoined by the armed merchant cruiser Prinz Eitel Friedrich, which he had earlier detached to attack Allied shipping in Australian waters. On 9 March 1915 , the last surviving cruiser of von Spee's squadron after his death at the Battle of the Falklands, returned to the island's Cumberland Bay, hoping to be interned by the Chilean authorities. Caught and fired upon by a British squadron at the Battle of Más a Tierra on 14 March, the ship was scuttled by its crew.

2010 tsunami
On 27 February 2010 Robinson Crusoe Island was hit by a tsunami following a magnitude 8.8 earthquake. Sixteen people lost their lives, and most of the coastal village of San Juan Bautista was washed away. The only warning the islanders had came from a 12-year-old girl, who noticed the sudden drawback of the sea that forewarns of the arrival of a tsunami wave and saved many of her neighbours from harm.

Society

Robinson Crusoe had an estimated population of 843 in 2012. Most of the island's inhabitants live in the village of San Juan Bautista on the north coast at Cumberland Bay. Although the community maintains a rustic serenity dependent on the spiny lobster trade, residents employ a few vehicles, a satellite Internet connection and televisions. The main airstrip, Robinson Crusoe Airfield, is located near the tip of the island's southwestern peninsula. The flight from Santiago de Chile is just under three hours. A ferry runs from the airstrip to San Juan Bautista.

Tourists number in the hundreds per year. One activity gaining popularity is scuba diving, particularly on the wreck of the German light cruiser Dresden, which was scuttled in Cumberland Bay during World War I.

Maya statue hypothesis 

A History Channel documentary was filmed on Robinson Crusoe Island. It aired on 3 January 2010 and showed two rock formations that Canadian explorer Jim Turner claimed were badly degraded Mayan statues. With no other sign of any pre-Columbian human presence on the island, however, the program has been criticized as lacking in scientific credibility.

See also
 Fernandezian Region

References

Further reading

 The story of German light cruiser Dresden which was scuttled in this island during World War I.

External links 

 Routes around the island with descriptions and photos of sights
 Robinson Crusoe Island satellite map with anchorages and other ocean-related information
 A detailed map of the island showing footpaths and walkers' refuges
 Juan Fernandez photo gallery with images of landscapes, flora and fauna on the island
 "Robinson Crusoe, Moai Statues and the Rapa Nui: the Stories of Chile’s Far-Off Islands"  from Sounds and Colours
 A digital field trip to Robinson Crusoe Island by Goat Island Images
 "Chasing Crusoe", a multimedia documentary about the island

 
Biosphere reserves of Chile
Former penal colonies
Juan Fernández Islands
Islands of Valparaíso Region
Prison islands
Important Bird Areas of the Juan Fernández Islands
Seabird colonies